Faisal bin Mishaal Al Saud (born 1959) is a Saudi Arabian politician and writer who has served as the governor of Al-Qassim Region since 29 January 2015. He is the eldest son of Prince Mishaal bin Saud Al Saud, a grandson of King Saud and a great-grandson of King Abdulaziz.

Early life and education
Prince Faisal was born in 1959. He received a bachelor's degree in political science in 1982 from King Saud University and a master's degree in political science in 1988 from the University of California, United States. He received his doctorate degree in political science in 2000 from the University of Durham, United Kingdom.

Career
Immediately after graduating from the university Prince Faisal joined the Ministry of Defense management cooperation and foreign aid in 1982. Moved to work in the form of intelligence and security of the armed forces in the Ministry of Defense in 1984. He served as an adviser for defense minister's office in 1988.

On 29 January 2015, he was appointed governor of the Al Qassim Region at the rank of minister, succeeding Prince Faisal bin Bandar Al Saud, who was appointed governor of Riyadh region.

References

External links

Faisal
1959 births
Faisal
Faisal
Faisal
Faisal
Living people
Faisal
University of California alumni